Omodos is a village in the Troödos Mountains of Cyprus. It is also located in the Limassol District of Cyprus and is 80 kilometers from the city of Nicosia. The village produces much wine and holds a wine festival every August. You can visit a 17th-century stone-built monastery via a cobblestone path and sample local wine for free at many outlets. There are restaurants, traditional tavernas, and modern bars housed in traditional buildings.

Gallery

References

Communities in Limassol District